is a Japanese politician of the Liberal Democratic Party, a member of the House of Representatives in the Diet (national legislature). A native of Kagawa Prefecture and graduate of Gakushuin Women's Junior College, she was elected to the House of Representatives for the first time in 2000. She lost her seat in 2003 but was re-elected two years later.

References

External links 
 Official website in Japanese.

Members of the House of Representatives (Japan)
Female members of the House of Representatives (Japan)
Politicians from Kagawa Prefecture
Living people
1939 births
Liberal Democratic Party (Japan) politicians
21st-century Japanese politicians
21st-century Japanese women politicians